Hulu Rajang is a federal constituency in Kapit Division (Bukit Mabong District, Kapit District & Belaga District), Sarawak, Malaysia, that has been represented in the Dewan Rakyat since 1971.

The federal constituency was created in the 1968 redistribution and is mandated to return a single member to the Dewan Rakyat under the first past the post voting system.

Spanning an area of over 34,000 km2, almost the size of the state of Pahang, Hulu Rajang is the largest parliamentary constituency in Malaysia. Consequently it also has the lowest population density, with only 1 person per sq km.

Demographics 
https://ge15.orientaldaily.com.my/seats/sarawak/p

History

Polling districts 
According to the gazette issued on 31 October 2022, the Hulu Rajang constituency has a total of 15 polling districts.

Representation history

State constituency

Current state assembly members

Local governments

Election results

References

Sarawak federal constituencies
Constituencies established in 1968